Carlos Dario Aurelio (born 22 May 1976) is an Argentine former football manager who is last known to have managed Liepāja.

Career

Playing career

In 1999, Aurelio signed for Italian side Brescia, where he made 25 league appearances and scored 0 goals. In 2001, he signed for Livingston in the Scottish top flight. In 2002, Aurelio signed for Italian third division club SPAL. In 2006, he signed for Argentinos Juniors in the Argentine top flight. In 2008, he signed for Argentine third division team Alvarado.

Managerial career

In 2018, Aurelio was appointed manager of Liepāja in Latvia but left due to not having the UEFA Pro License.

References

External links
 

Argentine footballers
Expatriate footballers in Italy
Serie B players
Brescia Calcio players
Serie C players
Argentine expatriate sportspeople in Italy
Argentine expatriate sportspeople in Latvia
Expatriate football managers in Latvia
FK Liepāja managers
Argentine football managers
1976 births
Cosenza Calcio players
Livingston F.C. players
S.P.A.L. players
Club Atlético Alvarado players
Association football defenders
Living people
Argentinos Juniors footballers
Argentine expatriate sportspeople in Scotland
Argentine expatriate footballers
Expatriate footballers in Scotland